The 1974–75 Cypriot Second Division was the 20th season of the Cypriot second-level football league. APOP Paphos FC won their 4th title.

Format
Due to the Turkish invasion of Cyprus which forced many teams that had their headquarters to the north Cyprus to be closed temporarily or permanently, CFA decided to have a Special mixed championship of Second & Third Division. In this championship could participate all the teams of the Second and Third Division. Participation was optional. The championship had two geographical groups. The winners of each group were playing against each other in the final phase and the winners were the champions of the league. The winner was considered as the 1974–75 Cypriot Second Division champions.

Nicosia-Keryneia Group

League standings

Larnaca-Limassol-Paphos

League standings

Champions playoff
The two group champions team, APOP Paphos FC and Ethnikos Assia FC faced each other in a two-legged relegation play-off for the championship.. APOP Paphos FC won both matches.

Ethnikos Assia FC 2–3 APOP Paphos FC
APOP Paphos FC 4–0 Ethnikos Assia FC

See also
 Cypriot Second Division
 1974–75 Cypriot First Division
 1974–75 Cypriot Cup

References

Cypriot Second Division seasons
Cyprus
1974–75 in Cypriot football